Phaenagrotis hecateia is a moth of the family Noctuidae. It is found in the Santiago, Valparaíso, Maule and Araucanía Regions of Chile.

The wingspan is 40–45 mm. Adults are on wing from February to May.

External links
 Noctuinae of Chile

Noctuinae
Moths described in 1953
Moths of South America
Endemic fauna of Chile